"I Still Believe in You" is a song recorded by British singer Cliff Richard. It was released as a single in November 1992 and peaked at number 7 in the UK Singles Chart. It was the first single to be released off his 1993 album The Album.

Music video
Richard performs the song against a backdrop of gauzes and screens with images overlays of a woman and young girl as the subject of the song. The video was recorded on 3 November 1992, produced by Jayne Griffiths and directed by Paul Cox.

2014 support campaign
Richard's fans mounted a social media support campaign for him in 2014 after allegations that fans fervently believed were false were made against him. The support campaign encouraged his fans to download the track to get it into the UK Singles chart. The campaign was successful in getting the song to number 57 in the weekly singles chart.

Track listing
7-inch vinyl and cassette single 
 "I Still Believe in You"
 "Bulange Downpour"

CD single – Part 1 
 "I Still Believe in You"
 "Bulange Downpour"
 "There's No Power in Pity"

CD single – Part 2 
 "I Still Believe in You"
 "Remember" ("When Two Worlds Drift Apart") (French adaption)
 "Ocean Deep"

Charts

References

1992 songs
1992 singles
Cliff Richard songs
EMI Records singles
Songs written by David Pomeranz
Songs written by Dean Pitchford